Warren Otis Arnold (June 3, 1839 – April 1, 1910) was a U.S. Representative from Rhode Island.

Born in Coventry, Rhode Island, Arnold attended the common schools.
He engaged in mercantile pursuits at Coventry from 1857 to 1864.
He was a manufacturer of cotton goods in Chepachet and Westerly, Rhode Island, until 1866 when he began the manufacture of woolen goods.

Arnold was elected as a Republican to the Fiftieth and Fifty-first Congresses (March 4, 1887 – March 3, 1891).
He was a candidate for re-election in 1890 to the Fifty-second Congress. But, as neither candidate received a majority the general assembly ordered a new election, in which he declined to be a participant.

Arnold was elected to the Fifty-fourth Congress (March 4, 1895 – March 3, 1897).
He declined to be a candidate for renomination in 1896.
He continued his former manufacturing pursuits until his death in Westerly, Washington County, Rhode Island, April 1, 1910.
He was interred in Acotes Hill Cemetery, Chepachet, Rhode Island.

Sources

1839 births
1910 deaths
People from Coventry, Rhode Island
Republican Party members of the United States House of Representatives from Rhode Island
19th-century American politicians